United Nations Security Council resolution 703, adopted without a vote on 9 August 1991, after examining the application of the Federated States of Micronesia for membership in the United Nations, the Council recommended to the General Assembly that Micronesia be admitted.

On 17 September 1991, the General Assembly admitted the Federated States of Micronesia under Resolution 46/2.

See also
 List of United Nations member states
 List of United Nations Security Council Resolutions 701 to 800 (1991–1993)

References

External links
 
Text of the Resolution at undocs.org

 0703
 0703
 0703
1991 in the Federated States of Micronesia
August 1991 events